Extreme racing involves paddling a kayak down a section of hard whitewater. The race is similar to a timed version of creeking. The rivers used for this sport are typically class V, containing waterfalls and dangerous rapids. Races may have mass-starts or individual timed runs. Having two boat categories is also becoming popular among extreme racers.  Many races have different classes including short boat, long boat, and hand paddle.  

By comparison, whitewater racing involves racing specialized canoes or kayaks down grade II to IV rivers. Traditional whitewater racing boats would be unsuitable for rivers used in extreme races because they are typically made from lightweight carbon fiber, and thus are beyond the ability of the majority of whitewater kayakers.  Many whitewater kayak manufacturers are now introducing specialized extreme racing kayaks.  These kayaks feature the same durable plastic as many whitewater boats, while incorporating faster hull shapes. Some leading whitewater kayak manufacturers are Jackson Kayaks and Dagger Kayaks

Extreme races may be included with whitewater kayaking events. For example, the Ulla Extreme Race is part of the Sjoa Kayak Festival in Norway.  In addition to races taking place at larger events, many extreme races are being held as stand-alone events. The Association for Whitewater Professionals has created a whitewater racing series titled the Whitewater World Series.

Some notable extreme whitewater events are: 
The GoPro Mountain Games,
The North Fork Championship,
The Little White Salmon Race,
The Whitewater Grand Prix,
The Green Race,
and Rey Del Rio. 

Extreme races are held on many rivers worldwide, such as the River Nevis in Scotland, the River Ulla in Norway, Russell Fork river, Little White Salmon River, and North Fork Payette River in the United States, as well the Lea River in Australia, among others.

Extreme racing originated in the wetlands of New Zealand by extreme racer Hans Meimbam.

See also
Freeboating
Creeking
Whitewater Kayaking

References

Canoeing and kayaking